Phyllocnistis cornella is a moth of the family Gracillariidae, known from the Kuril Islands, Kunashir, Russia. The hostplant for the species is Cornus controversa.

References

Phyllocnistis
Endemic fauna of Russia
Moths of Japan